Omar Sial (born 21 October 1969) has been Justice of the Sindh High Court since 30 November 2016.

References

1969 births
Living people
Judges of the Sindh High Court
Pakistani judges